Gryfów Śląski, simplified to Gryfów, is a historic town in Lwówek Śląski County, Lower Silesian Voivodeship, in south-western Poland. It is the seat of the administrative district (gmina) called Gmina Gryfów Śląski. As of 2019, the town has a population of 6,636. The town is located between Zgorzelec and Jelenia Góra, on the Kwisa river.

History

The region formed part of Poland since the 10th century and the first ruler Mieszko I of Poland.
The settlement of Gryfów Śląski arose from a castle built by the Piast Duke Bolesław I the Tall of Silesia near the border with Upper Lusatia. It received town privileges by Polish Duke Bolesław II the Bald in 1242. The ruins of the medieval Gryf Castle, a possession of the House of Schaffgotsch from 1400 on, are still visible south of the town. In 1274 Gryfów became part of the Silesian Duchy of Jawor, which finally was incorporated by the Kingdom of Bohemia in 1392. 

Floods hit the city in 1469, 1550 and 1609, droughts in 1472, 1590 and 1616, and epidemics in 1582, 1585 and 1633. In 1589 the town's first pharmacy was founded. In 1617 the first big fair took place. During the Thirty Years' War, the town was plundered twice by the Swedes, in 1639 and 1645. After the First Silesian War it was annexed by Prussia in 1742. In 1865 the Greiffenberg station opened on the Silesian Mountain Railway line from Görlitz to Reibnitz (Rybnica).

From 1871 to 1945 the town was part of the German Empire. After World War II, the town was part of the region that became part of Poland under the terms of the Potsdam Agreement.

Sights

The historic sights of Gryfów Śląski include:
the St. Jadwiga Church, dating back to the 15th century
the town hall, built in the Renaissance style in the 16th century, later rebuilt
the Market Square (Rynek) filled with historic townhouses, dating back to the 15th-19th centuries,
medieval town walls
the Saint Lawrence church, dating back to the 16th century

Notable people
 Hans Ulrich von Schaffgotsch (1595-1635), Silesian general
 Hermann Steudner (1832–1863), Africa explorer
 Curt Joël (1865–1945), German politician 
 Andrzej Chyra (born 1964), Polish actor

Twin towns – sister cities
See twin towns of Gmina Gryfów Śląski.

References

External links

 Gryfów Śląski website  
 Virtual Tour

Cities and towns in Lower Silesian Voivodeship
Lwówek Śląski County
Cities in Silesia